Chinmayi Sripaada is an Indian playback singer, working mainly for the South Indian film industry. She is also a voice actor, television presenter, radio jockey, and an entrepreneur. She is the founder and CEO of a translation services company Blue Elephant, a Skincare company importing K-beauty to India - Isle Of Skin, and a medi-spa Deep Skin Dialogues in Chennai and Hyderabad. She is often credited as Chinmayee and Indai Haza. She rose to fame for her critically acclaimed song "Oru Deivam Thantha Poovae" from the National Award winning movie Kannathil Muthamittal.

Early life and background 
Chinmayi received the CCRT Scholarship for Young Talent for Carnatic Music from the Government of India at the age of 10. She won the gold medal from All India Radio for Ghazals in 2000 and the Silver for Hindustani Classical Music in 2002. She learned German as a language in the Max Mueller Bhavan in Chennai and completed certification courses from NIIT and SSI in web design. During her school life, she held jobs with both Sify and studentconcepts.org.

Chinmayi has a Bachelor of Science degree in psychology from the University of Madras. She is also a versatile dancer and mostly enjoys the Odissi form of dance. Apart from her mother tongue Tamil, she speaks Telugu, Malayalam, Kannada, English, Marathi, Bengali and German fluently.

Chinmayi has been married to Rahul Ravindran since 5 May 2014.

Career

Singing

Playback singing 
She participated and won the singing of Sun TV, Saptasawarangal, following which she was introduced by Singer Srinivas to film composer Mr. A. R. Rahman. Chinmayi's playback singing career began with her performance of Rahman's "Oru Dheivam Thanta Poove" for the film Kannathil Muthamittal. After a couple of years of singing exclusively for Tamil, Telugu, Tulu and Malayalam films, she made her Bollywood debut in Mangal Pandey: The Rising with the song "Holi Re". About a year later, she garnered more recognition with her performances of "Tere Bina" and "Mayya" in the movie Guru. In 2007, the song "Beda Beda" marked her first venture into Kannada playback singing. She has since received critical acclaim for songs such as "Oru Dheivam Thantha Poove", "Sahana", "Vaarayo Vaarayo", "Kilimanjaro", "Sara Sara", "Asku Laska" and "Kaathale Kaathale". She has also sung in Marathi language in movies such as "sairat". Chinmayi as of date has to her credit over 1,000 songs in eight different languages.

Additional works 

Chinmayi announced that she will release a single in Tamil, Malayalam and Telugu in iTunes on occasion of Joy of Giving Week on 2 Oct, and proceeds of which shall go to 17000 ft.org so as to promote philanthropy, charity and the concept of giving.

She also collaborated with Shekar Ravjiani to launch a single in Tamil/Telugu the name of the album being Sitakokachiluka, again for which the legal downloads of it will go to Ma Niketan, a home that takes care of abandoned or uncared for girl children in Thane, a charity that composer Shekhar has been supporting.

Dubbing career 
Chinmayi turned a voice actor for the Tamil film Sillunu Oru Kadhal (2006), speaking dubbing for actress Bhumika Chawla, an opportunity that came through A. R. Rahman's office. Since then, she has dubbed for several lead actresses in Tamil films, including Tamannaah Bhatia, Sameera Reddy, Samantha Ruth Prabhu and Trisha Krishnan. She has also provided her voice in dubbed Telugu films. She dubbed for the critically acclaimed fictional character Jessie who was portrayed by Trisha in Vinnaithaandi Varuvaaya. The same character appeared in the film's Telugu version Ye Maaya Chesave and was portrayed by Samantha, while being portrayed by Amy Jackson in the Hindi version Ek Deewana Tha. Chinmayi dubbed for the character in all three films and won the Nandi Award for Best Female Dubbing Artist for Ye Maaya Chesave in 2010.  Chinmayi dubbed in Vettai for Sameera Reddy and has dubbed for her in all Tamil movies. She dubbed for Samantha Ruth Prabhu in Eega in Telugu and its Tamil version Naan Ee in 2012. She dubbed voice for Nayanthara in the Tamil version of the movie Sri Rama Rajyam, and in the telugu version of Naanum Rowdy Dhaan. Chinmayi has also been the voice of Lavanya Tripathi in many of her movies, starting from Andala Rakshasi, then Bhale Bhale Magadivoy, Maayavan, Chaavu Kaburu Challaga, and A1 Express. Chinmayi has dubbed for Samantha Ruth Prabhu in many films like Rabhasa, Atharintiki Daaredi, Ramayya Vasthavayya, Seethamma Vakitlo Sirimalle Chettu, 24, Oh! Baby and many more in Telugu.

Television and radio 
Chinmayi served as a television presenter during the first season of Airtel Super Singer on STAR Vijay that was aired between April and August 2006 and the first season of Airtel Super Singer Junior from February 2007 to July 2007. In 2008, she returned as host of the second season of Airtel Super Singer, though she discontinued her role before the completion of the season, as she stated the show extended the period of the initial contract. During this time, she was also a radio jockey on Aahaa FM 91.9 in Chennai, on a breakfast show titled Aahaa Kaapi Klub. She later began compering Star Plus's Chhote Ustaad, which ran concurrently with another music talent show she started hosting in June, the debut season of Sun TV's Sangeetha Mahayuddham. On 15 August 2010, Chinmayi announced that that day's Chhote Ustaad would be her last as host, leaving the show after only eight episodes. Now she is in the judges panel of Jaya star singers in Jaya TV.

Personal life 

Chinmayi is the granddaughter of Dr. Sripada Pinakapani. In September 2013, through Twitter, Chinmayi's mother Padmhasini revealed Chinmayi was engaged to Rahul Ravindran, who is also a South Indian actor. Chinmayi and Rahul were friends, colleagues and in due course started dating each other by June 2013. They got married on 5 May 2014. Their twin children Driptah and Sharvas were born on 21 June 2022.

Activism 
Through her Twitter account, Chinmayi has been at the forefront of highlighting claims of sexual harassment in the Indian music industry, in what is widely considered as India's Me Too movement. She accused  Vairamuthu of sexual harassment and highlighted claims made by others against OS Thyagarajan, Raghu Dixit, Mandolin U Rajesh, Karthik and several other carnatic singers but naming anyone individually. Chinmayi tweeted allegations made by a woman against the Tamil Nadu Brahmins Association (TAMBRAS) president N Narayanan as part of her efforts.

Entrepreneurship 
Chinmayi is the CEO of Blue Elephant, a translation services company she founded in August 2005. The company has since been the language service provider for various Multinational companies like Scope E Knowledge, Ford, Dell, Ashok Leyland, and Reliance India. She received an award from SAARC Chamber for Women Entrepreneurship for Excellence in a niche industry for Blue Elephant in 2010. In 2011, she became the first woman entrepreneur from Tamil Nadu to be selected for the prestigious FORTUNE/US State Department Global Women's Mentoring Partnership Program.

Discography

Filmography

Voice artist

Other roles

Awards, nominations and honours 

 Tamil Nadu State Film Awards
 2002: Best Female Playback – "Oru Deivam Thantha Poove" (Kannathil Muthamittal)
 2007:  Best Female Playback – "Sahana" (Shivaji)
 2010:  Best Female Playback – "Kilimanjaro" (Enthiran)

 Andhra Pradesh State Nandi Awards
2015-Best Female Playback Singer-"Yenno Yenno Varnala"(Malli Malli Idi Rani Roju)
2016-Best Female Playback Singer-"Manasantha Megamai"(Kalyana Vaibhogame)
2010-Best Female Dubbing Artist- Ye Maaya Chesave (Samantha Akkineni)
2014-Best Female Dubbing Artist- Manam (Samantha Akkineni)

 Filmfare Awards South
 2009: Best Female Playback Singer – Tamil – "Vaarayo Vaarayo" (Aadhavan)
 2011: Best Female Playback Singer – Tamil – "Sara Sara" (Vaagai Sooda Vaa)
 2016: Best Female Playback Singer – Malayalam – "Oonjalil Aadi" (Action Hero Biju)
 2018: Best Female Playback Singer – Tamil – "Kaathale Kaathale" ('96)
2011: Nominated, Best Female Playback Singer – Tamil – "Kilimanjaro" (Enthiran)
2013: Nominated, Best Female Playback Singer – Tamil – "Asku Laska" (Nanban)
2015: Nominated, Best Female Playback Singer – Telugu – "Ra Rakumara" (Govindudu Andarivadele)
2017: Nominated, Best Female Playback Singer – Tamil – "Naan Un" (24)
2017: Nominated, Best Female Playback Singer – Telugu – "Oye Meghamala" (Majnu)
 2018: Nominated, Best Female Playback Singer – Telugu – "Yenti Yenti" (Geetha Govindam)

 Filmfare Awards Marathi
 2016: Best Female Playback Singer - Sairaat Zaala Ji (Sairat)

 South Indian International Movie Awards
 2011 – SIIMA Award for Best Female Playback Singer (Tamil) – "Sara Sara" (Vaagai Sooda Vaa)
 2019 - SIIMA Award for Best Female Playback Singer – Telugu - "Priyathama Priyathama" (Majili)
 2013 : Nominated, SIIMA Award for Best Female Playback Singer (Tamil) - "Mella Sirithai" (Kalyana Samayal Saadham)
 2014 : Nominated, SIIMA Award for Best Female Playback Singer (Telugu) - "Vaddantune" (Run Raja Run)
 2015 : Nominated, SIIMA Award for Best Female Playback Singer (Tamil) - "Idhaythai Yedho Ondru" (Yennai Arindhaal)
 2015 : Nominated, SIIMA Award for Best Female Playback Singer (Telugu) - "Vennellona Mounam" (Surya vs Surya)
 2018 : Nominated, SIIMA Award for Best Female Playback Singer (Tamil) - "Kadhale Kadhale" ('96)
 2018 : Nominated, SIIMA Award for Best Female Playback Singer (Telugu) - "Yenti Yenti" (Geetha Govindam)
 2020 : Nominated, SIIMA Award for Best Female Playback Singer (Telugu) - "Oohale" (Jaanu)
 2020 : Nominated, SIIMA Award for Best Female Playback Singer (Kannada) - "Soul of Dia" (Dia)

 Mirchi Music Awards
 2013: Female Vocalist of the Year – "Titli" (Chennai Express)
 2014: Mirchi Platinum Disc - Mast Magan
 2014: Mirchi Music Awards - Song of the Year - Zehnaseeb from Hasee Toh Phasee
 2014: Mirchi Music Awards - Album of the Year - 2 States

 Vijay Awards
 2009: Best Female Playback Singer – "Vaarayo Vaarayo" (Aadhavan)
 2011: Best Female Playback Singer – "Sara Sara" (Vaagai Sooda Vaa)

 Norway Tamil Film Festival Awards
 2011:  Best Female Playback Singer – "Sara Sara" (Vaagai Sooda Vaa)
 2018:  Best Female Playback Singer – "Kaathalae Kaathalae" (96)
 Nominated : Best Female Dubbing Artist - 96

 Vijay Music Awards
 2010: Popular Female Playback Singer – "Kilimanjaro" (Endhiran)
 2011: Best Female Singer Female – "Sara Sara" (Vaagai Sooda Vaa)
Sakshi Excellence Awards
2019: Most Popular Singer Of The Year - "Yenti Yenti" from Geetha Govindam & "Priyathama" from Majili
2021: Most Popular Singer Of The Year - "Oohale Oohale" from Jaanu

 The Times Film Awards
 2011: The Chennai Times Award for Best Female Playback Singer – "Sara Sara" (Vaagai Sooda Vaa)

 Edison Awards
 2011: Edison Award for Best Female Playback Singer – "Chotta Chotta" (Engeyum Eppodhum)
 2012: Edison Award for Best Female Playback Singer – "Asku Laska" (Nanban)
 2018 : Nominated, Edison Award for Best Female Playback Singer - "Kaathale Kaathale" ('96)

 Ananda Vikatan Cinema Awards
 2018: Best Playback Singer (Female) - All songs from 96

 Isaiaruvi Tamil Music Awards
 2007: Best Female Playback Singer – "Sahana" (Shivaji) 
 2009: Best Female Playback Singer – "Vaarayo Vaarayo" (Aadhavan)

 Mirchi Music Awards South
 2010: Best Female Playback Singer – Tamil – "Kilimanjaro" (Endhiran)

 BIG Tamil Entertainment Awards
 2010: BIG Tamil Award for Best Entertaining Female Singer – "Poove Poove" (Siddhu +2)
 2011: BIG Tamil Melody Music Award for Best Female Playback Singer – "Sara Sara" (Vaagai Sooda Vaa)
 2015: BIG Tamil Music Awards - Best Female Playback Singer - "Ennodu Nee Irundhaal" (I)

 Zee Cine Awards Telugu
 2019 - Zee Cine Awards Telugu for Best Female Playback Singer - "Priyathama Priyathama" (Majili)

 Other Cine Awards
 2002: Award from Ajanta Fine Arts for "Oru Deivam" (Kannathil Muthamittal)
 2002: Best Media Associates Award for Best Female Playback Singer – "Oru Deivam" (Kannathil Muthamittal)
 2002: ITFA Award for Best Upcoming Playback Singer – "Oru Deivam" (Kannathil Muthamittal)
 2007: Film Fans Association Award for Beat Female Playback Singer – "Sahana" (Shivaji)
 2007: Jaya TV Award for Best Female Playback Singer – "Sahana" (Shivaji)
 2007: Lions Club Award for Best Female Playback singer – "Sahana(Shivaji)"
 2009: Alandur Fine Arts for Best Female Playback Singer
 2009: South Scope Cine Award for Best Female Playback Singer – "Vaarayo Vaarayo" (Aadhavan)
 2010: MGR Sivaji Academy Award for Best Female Playback Singer – "Kilimanjaro" (Endhiran)
 2010: Vijayam Tamil Movie Award for Favourite Female Singer of the Year
 2011: Navaratna Women Achievers Award for Best Female Playback Singer
 2011: Filmfans' Association Award for Best Female Playback Singer – "Sara Sara" (Vaagai Sooda Vaa)
 2011: Variety Film Award for Best Female Playback Singer – "Sara Sara" (Vaagai Sooda Vaa)
 2015: Ugadhi Puraskar - Best Female Playback Singer - Vadhantune
 2018: Behindwoods Gold Medals - Voice of the Year (Female) - 96
 2018: Radio City Awards - Best Singer Female (Telugu) - Yenti Yenti - "Geetha Govindam" & Mellaga Mellaga - "Chi La Sow"
 2018: Mahila Ratna Awards - Best Singer Female (Telugu) - Yenti Yenti - "Geetha Govindam" 
2021: Chandanavana Film Critics Academy Award for Best Playback Singer - Female for the song "Soul of Dia" from Dia 

 Other Nominations
 2007: Star Screen Award for Best Female Playback – "Tere Bina"
 2009: Tamil Cinema Press Awards for Best Female Playback Singer – "Nila Nee Vaanam" (Pokkisham)
 2011: BIG Salute to Tamil Women Entertainer Award for Best Singer
 2014: Screen Awards for Best Female Playback Singer - "Titli" (Chennai Express)
 2014: Star Guild Awards for Best Female Playback Singer - " Main Rang Sharbaton Ka" (Phata Poster Nikla Hero)
 2015: Bollywood Hungama Surfers Choice Music Awards for Best Female Playback Singer - "Zehnaseeb" (Hasee Toh Phasee)
 2017: Female vocalist of the year for the song "Sairat Zala Ji" from the film Sairat, Mirchi Music Awards

Other awards 
 1999: All India First and Best Performer Award from Sangam Kala Group
 2000: All India First from All India Radio for Ghazals
 2003: Pride of Sangam Award
 2008: RITZ Amazing Woman Award
 2009: Vikatan Award for Best Television Show Host
 2011: Award from SAARC Chamber for Women Entrepreneurship for Excellence
 2011: Vocational Excellence Award from Rotary Club of Madras 
2015: Mercedes Benz - Ritz Woman of Merit award
2015: Rotary Club Inner Wheel (Nanganallur) : Swarna Ratna Award
2016: Indian of the Year: CNN IBN : Chennai Micro

Honours 
 2011: She has been selected as a Mentee to the Fortune/US State Department Global Women's Mentoring Partnership. She is one among three Indians and the only and first person from Tamil Nadu among 35 other women all over the world.
 On 19 October Chinmayi was bestowed with a Femina Penn Shakti Award in recognition of her entrepreneurial and social initiatives.

Trivia 

 2010: She came on-screen for the song composed for World Tamil Classical Conference in 2010 directed by Gautham Vasudev Menon and composed by A. R. Rahman – Semmozhiyaana Thamizh Mozhiyaam
 2011: She launched an App named as Chinmayi Sripada App. She was the first female singer in the world to have an exclusive app on both iOS and Android devices.
 2012: She did her first ever advertisement for Dheepam Oil in all the four south Indian languages (Tamil, Telugu, Malayalam, Kannada)

References

External links 

Tamil singers
Tamil playback singers
Telugu playback singers
Indian women playback singers
Television personalities from Tamil Nadu
Singers from Chennai
Living people
Bollywood playback singers
Kannada playback singers
Malayalam playback singers
Indian voice actresses
Tamil Nadu State Film Awards winners
Filmfare Awards South winners
Indian radio actresses
21st-century Indian singers
21st-century Indian women singers
Women musicians from Tamil Nadu
Indian women classical singers
Women Carnatic singers
Carnatic singers
Indian folk-pop singers
Year of birth missing (living people)
South Indian International Movie Awards winners
Nandi Award winners
Zee Cine Awards Telugu winners